Karma Aur Holi is a 2009 Indian romantic-drama film written and directed by débutant Manish Gupta.

Synopsis 
The film revolves around an NRI couple, desperate to have a biological child. The couple host a party to celebrate Holi, with Indian and American guests. The plot deals with the events happening further.

Cast 
Randeep Hooda as Dev Kohli
Sushmita Sen as Meera D. Kohli
Deepal Shaw as Preeti Kolhapure
Naomi Campbell as Jennifer Bogtstra
Suresh Oberoi as Shekhar Khanna 
Rati Agnihotri as Vani Tendulkar
Suchitra Krishnamoorthy as Sujata

Soundtrack 
The film's music was composed by Raju Singh with lyrics from Sameer Pandey. It also features cover versions of Nusrat Fateh Ali Khan's "Jism Dhamakta" which was originally written by Javed Akhtar.

Box office and reviews 

The movie was a box office and critical failure.

References

External links 
Film review on Bollywood Hungama
Rajeev Masand's Movie review , CNN-IBN

Film review on Chakpak
Sushmita Sen in Karma Aur Holi

2009 films
2000s Hindi-language films

Indian romantic drama films